Quinn McColgan (born January 31, 2002) is an American actress from Delaware, who has appeared in five feature films, four TV shows, one TV movie and a short. Her breakthrough role was in the TV mini-series Mildred Pierce  as Ray Pierce (the younger daughter of Mildred Pierce, played by Kate Winslet) directed by Todd Haynes, and one of her best known roles was Becca in the Liam Neeson film Non-Stop (2014) directed by Spanish director Jaume Collet-Serra.

Career
Starting her career in commercials, McColgan has moved up to have prominent roles in feature films and television shows. Her performance as Ray Pierce in the TV miniseries Mildred Pierce received a Young Artist Award nomination for 2012. McColgan's acting ability has been praised in The Hollywood Reporter,  where Frank Scheck in his review of the feature film  Extinction commented "Far better is child actress McColgan, delivering a well-rounded, naturalistic performance. Here's hoping she gets a better movie next time." In the New York Daily News review of Extinction, Katherine Pushkar commented: "... the upside though is  McColgan as Lu...clearly someone to watch".

Filmography
 2010 Nova TV Documentary Series Episode: 37.14 as Performer (Bit Part)
 2011 Team Umizoomi TV Series Episode: Counting Comet,as Melissa (3rd Billing)
 2011 Mildred Pierce  TV Mini-series, as Ray Pierce (5th Billing)
 2011 Unforgettable TV Series Episode: Up in Flames, as Anna Halsey (minor role)
 2012 Dark House  TV Movie, as Paula (10th Billing)
 2012 Unburden'  Short, as Callie (2nd Billing)
 2014 Ping Pong Summer  Feature Film, (Bit Part)
 2014 Non-Stop Feature Film, as Becca (13th Billing)
 2014 Wishin' and Hopin' Feature Film, as Rosalie Twerki (10th Billing)
 2015 The Blacklist TV Series Episode: The Kenyon Family No.71,  as The Child Bride (minor role)
 2015 Extinction Feature Film, as Lu (3rd Billing)
 2015 Love the Coopers aka Christmas with the Coopers'', Feature Film, as Young Charlotte 12-14yrs old ( minor role)

References

External links
 

2002 births
Living people
21st-century American actresses
Place of birth missing (living people)
Actresses from Delaware